Edgardo Baudilio Díaz Del Valle (born October 20, 1988 in San Juan, Argentina) is an Argentine footballer playing for Deportivo Maipú.

Career 
He started out with Club Atlético San Martín (San Juan) of the Primera B Nacional in 2008. After two seasons he was recruited by Atlético Trinidad. He played there for one year before migrating to Chile in 2011, where he joined Unión Temuco for a brief spell. In June of that year, he signed for Bolivian first division club Blooming. He played than with Chilean club Deportes Naval and signed with an breakpoint by Club Gimnasia y Esgrima La Plata, for Hungarian side in early 2013 Kecskeméti TE. Diaz played until 30 May 2013 in only four games for Kecskeméti TE, before returned to Argentine, to sign for Club Atlético Unión (Villa Krause).

References

External links
 
 BDFA profile 

1988 births
Living people
People from San Juan, Argentina
Association football midfielders
Argentine footballers
Argentine expatriate footballers
Central Córdoba de Rosario footballers
Trinidad de San Juan players
Club Blooming players
Unión Temuco footballers
Naval de Talcahuano footballers
Gimnasia y Esgrima de Concepción del Uruguay footballers
Kecskeméti TE players
Club de Gimnasia y Esgrima La Plata footballers
San Martín de Tucumán footballers
Deportivo Maipú players
Chaco For Ever footballers
Juventud Unida Universitario players
Primera B de Chile players
Nemzeti Bajnokság I players
Primera C Metropolitana players
Torneo Argentino A players
Torneo Argentino B players
Expatriate footballers in Chile
Expatriate footballers in Bolivia
Expatriate footballers in Hungary
Argentine expatriate sportspeople in Chile
Argentine expatriate sportspeople in Bolivia
Argentine expatriate sportspeople in Hungary
Sportspeople from San Juan Province, Argentina